Ivan Tabanov (born 7 August 1966) is a Moldovan football manager and former player who is currently the manager of FC Sucleia.

In October 2014 Ivan Tabanov was interrogated and arrested by the Latvian State Police, being accused of trucking matches. Being a suspect in the ongoing investigation, he was disqualified from the Latvian Higher League for an undetermined period of time by the Latvian Football Federation.

In August 2016, he was appointed sporting director of Saxan. In January 2017, he became the head coach of the club. In July 2020, he was appointed head coach of Sucleia.

References

External links 
 
 
 
 

1966 births
Living people
Association football defenders
Moldovan footballers
Moldova international footballers
Moldovan Super Liga players
Moldovan football managers
FC Zimbru Chișinău managers
FC Daugava managers
FC Saxan managers
Moldovan Super Liga managers
Moldovan expatriate football managers
Expatriate football managers in Latvia
Moldovan expatriate sportspeople in Latvia